The Holy Girl is a 2004 Argentinian drama film directed by Lucrecia Martel.  The picture was executively produced by Pedro Almodóvar, Agustín Almodóvar, and Esther García.  It was produced by Lita Stantic. The film features Mercedes Morán, María Alche, Carlos Belloso, Alejandro Urdapilleta, Julieta Zylberberg, among others.

Plot
The film takes place in the small town of La Ciénaga, at the Hotel Termas, a dilapidated Argentine hotel, during a medical conference. Two young teenage girls, Amalia (María Alché) and her best friend Josefina (Julieta Zylberberg), begin to explore their new sexuality and, at the same time, have Catholic religious passion. Amalia lives with her attractive divorced mother (Mercedes Morán), who owns the hotel, and her uncle Freddy (Alejandro Urdapilleta). During this time, in Amalia's mind, spiritual and sexual impulses are seeming to converge.

One day, in the midst of a large crowd watching the performance of a musician playing the theremin, Dr. Jano (Carlos Belloso), a participant in the conference and hotel guest, rubs up sexually against Amalia. She is upset but takes his inappropriate action as a sign that her Catholic faith has given her a mission: to save Dr. Jano from such inappropriate behavior. Afterward, the object of Amalia's desire becomes the married middle-aged doctor and she begins to spy on him. Amalia's story is partly about an adolescent girl's discovery of her sexual vulnerability and the sexual power she possesses.

Cast
 Mercedes Morán as Helena
 Carlos Belloso as Dr. Jano
 Alejandro Urdapilleta as Freddy
 María Alché as Amalia
 Julieta Zylberberg as Josefina
 Mía Maestro as Inés
 Marta Lubos as Mirta
 Arturo Goetz as Dr. Vesalio
 Alejo Mango as Dr. Cuesta
 Mónica Villa as Madre de Josefina
 Leandro Stivelman as Julian
 Manuel Schaller as Thermin player

Background
The screenplay of the film was written by director Lucrecia Martel. Martel said, "The film isn't strictly autobiographical, but what I put in it is my personal experience in life, my memories. When I was in my teens, I was a very religious person. I thought I had a special relationship with God, or anything that was up there. Now, I don't believe in miracles, but I do believe in the emotion you feel in front of a miracle - the emotion of something unexpected revealed to you."

As part of the way she uses the camera the film has few establishing shots or transition shots because she makes the case it physically separates a space from its moment in the film.

Filming location
The film was shot entirely in Salta, in the Salta Province, Argentina.  The director/screenwriter was born in Salta.

Distribution
The film first opened in Argentina on 6 May 2004.  It was selected for competition and featured internationally at the 2004 Cannes Film Festival on 16 May.

The film was also shown at various film festivals, including: the Karlovy Vary Film Festival, the Toronto International Film Festival, the Helsinki International Film Festival, the London Film Festival, the Hong Kong International Film Festival, and the Reykjavik International Film Festival.

In the United States it was presented at the New York Film Festival on 10 October 2004, and the Seattle International Film Festival on 20 May 2005. Fine Line Features gave it a limited US theatrical release on 29 April 2005.

Critical reception
A.O. Scott, film critic for The New York Times, called the film an "elusive, feverish and altogether amazing second feature..." He also liked Martel's artistic directorial approach to films, and wrote, "Her visual style is similarly oblique, as she frames her characters through half-opened doors, at odd angles and in asymmetrical close-ups. To a degree that is sometimes disorienting, Ms. Martel explores the mysteries of the senses. They are our instruments for knowing ourselves, each other and the world, but they also mislead us, bringing pain, pleasure and confusion in equal measure."

Kevin Thomas, critic for the Los Angeles Times, wrote, "[the film] reveals the style, insight and confidence that are the marks of a major director."  He also said of director Martel, "[She's] a subtle artist and a sharp observer, Martel manages a large cast with an ease that matches her skill at storytelling, within which psychological insight and social comment flow easily and implicitly."

Film critic Ruth Stein also credits director Martel for capturing the mood of the film, and wrote, "Martel is especially good at capturing a claustrophobic environment, and she wisely leaves ambiguous the question of the doctor's complicity in Amalia's frenzied state. He fails to recognize her when she starts stalking him -- an indication of the randomness of the act done to the accompaniment of a theremin."

The film holds a 77% approval rating at Rotten Tomatoes, with 43 of 56 reviews being favorable. On Metacritic, it has a weighted average score of 75 out of 100 based on reviews from 22 critics, indicating "generally favorable reviews".

Awards
Wins
 Clarin Entertainment Awards: Clarin Award; Best Director, Lucrecia Martel; Best New FIlm Actress, Julieta Zylberberg; 2004.
 São Paulo International Film Festival: Critics Award, Honorable Mention, Lucrecia Martel; 2004.

Nominations
 Cannes Film Festival: Golden Palm, Lucrecia Martel; 2004.
 Argentine Film Critics Association Awards: Silver Condor; Best Cinematography, Félix Monti; Best Costume Design, Julio Suárez; Best New Actress, María Alche; Best Supporting Actress, Julieta Zylberberg; 2005.

References

External links
 
 
 
 La niña santa at cinenacional.com 
  

2004 films
2004 drama films
Films directed by Lucrecia Martel
Argentine independent films
Italian independent films
Spanish independent films
Dutch independent films
El Deseo films